Rashaad Mosweu (born 4 April 1998) is a Botswana cricketer. He played in the 2015 ICC World Cricket League Division Six tournament.

References

External links
 

1998 births
Living people
Botswana cricketers
Place of birth missing (living people)